Georg Bruchmüller (11 December 1863 – 26 January 1948) was a German artillery officer who greatly influenced the development of modern artillery tactics. He was nicknamed Durchbruchmüller, a combination of the German word Durchbruch (breakthrough) with his name.

Early life 

Bruchmüller was born in Berlin into a middle-class family. He studied physics at Berlin University; when he left in 1883 he became a three-year volunteer in the Imperial Army.

In 1897 and 1898, Bruchmüller served as a battery commander in Fußartillerie-Regiment Nr. 3 in the Fortress of Mainz. Next, he commanded a battery in the Lehr-Bataillon (Demonstration Battalion) of the Royal Prussian Fußartillerie-Schießschule (Foot Artillery Firing School) in Jüterbog from 1901 to 1902. During this time, he worked with one of the instructors at the Fußartillerie-Schießschule, Hauptmann Arthur Bilse, a heavy artillery specialist. (Bilse, when General der Fußartillerie 15, was killed in action on New Year's Day 1916, at Les Baraques France.) In 1908, Bruchmüller was promoted to major and assigned to write the tactical manual for foot artillery.
In 1913 he was thrown from his horse and subsequently suffered a nervous breakdown. He was medically discharged as a lieutenant colonel, but with major's pay.

World War I 
At the beginning of World War I, Bruchmüller was recalled to active duty and soon became artillery commander of the 86th Division on the Eastern Front. In 1915 he fought in thirteen actions, winning the Iron Cross First Class and Second Class. The Russians conducted the Lake Naroch Offensive from 18 to 30 March 1916. For the counter-attack, Bruchmüller persuaded the commander of the Tenth Army, Generaloberst Hermann von Eichhorn, to centralize the artillery command. Bruchmüller planned the leading of the infantry attack with a creeping barrage, which contributed to the German victory, for which he was awarded the Pour le Mérite, Germany's highest military award, in 1917 (one of only four senior artillery officers to receive this honor during the war).

The French and British used prolonged bombardments before an infantry assault, to try to destroy the defenders, like the seven-day barrage opening the Battle of the Somme, while the Germans favored short, intense bombardments, sometimes called hurricane bombardments, like the ten-hour barrage which opened the Battle of Verdun. Bruchmüller devised intricate, centrally-controlled firing plans for intense bombardments. His operations emphasized fire in depth throughout the enemy positions, switching rapidly from target to target and then back again, which required strict, detailed control of every gun, to cause maximum disruption of the defenders. Each battery of each type of weapon received fire missions on a timetable. The first stage hit headquarters, phone links, command posts, enemy batteries and infantry positions; the fire was sudden, concentrated, and made extensive use of gas shells. In the second stage, more guns engaged the enemy batteries; much firing was required (for example,  from  howitzers were considered necessary to eliminate a gun pit). The third stage directed fire for effect on targets; some batteries continued to shell infantry positions, while heavy pieces engaged long-range targets to cut off reinforcements. For some of the key counter-attacks during Russia's Brusilov Offensive, Bruchmüller directed the 76 artillery batteries of Heeresgruppe von Linsingen. In July 1917, he commanded 134 batteries during the counter-attack that recovered Tarnopol from the Russians, after its loss during the Kerensky Offensive.

Surprise was essential for creating maximum disruption, so Bruchmüller adopted the Pulkowski Method, for bombardments without the customary registration fire. The position of each gun was surveyed. Knowing the muzzle velocity of the gun, taking into account variables like air temperature, wind velocity and direction, using tables provided by mathematicians, and pre-registering guns on firing ranges, it was possible to fire fairly accurately at targets on the gunnery maps. The Germans concealed their attack preparations but their initial target data had to be precise. (The British had fired from the map in their assault at Cambrai on 20 November 1917.)

Bruchmüller commanded the artillery of the 8th Army (General Oskar von Hutier) in the victory at Riga in September 1917. The 8th Army moved west soon thereafter and, in the first months of 1918, Bruchmüller's techniques were taught to gunners at a special school in Belgium before the German spring offensive of 1918. Infantry officers were also taught his methods and there were joint infantry-artillery exercises with live ammunition, with advances shielded by the creeping barrage. The first attack, Operation Michael, began with a barrage of  shells in five hours, almost  a second. Defying instructions, Bruchmüller eliminated preliminary registration by firing from the map and then directed the artillery during the next attack at the Battle of the Lys on Flanders, where the artillery had not yet been trained in the Pulkowski method. The guns were registered by observation during the first phase of the bombardment. Bruchmüller was awarded the oak leaves to his Pour le Mérite on March 26, 1918, one of just two higher artillery commanders decorated this way. Still only a lieutenant-colonel and a retired officer on temporary recall, he commanded the artillery in Heeresgruppe Deutscher Kronprinz in the Third Battle of the Aisne and the Second Battle of the Marne. The artillery fired from the map in darkness and the infantry advanced at first light. Ludendorff cited him as an example of "the decisive influence of personality on the course of events in war".

Post-war 
Bruchmüller was not eligible for the post-war Reichswehr, because the Versailles Treaty prohibited heavy artillery, and he was retired in 1919 as a full colonel. He wrote several books on artillery that were translated into English, French and Russian. In 1939, on the 25th anniversary of the Battle of Tannenberg, he was promoted to major-general on the retired list. Bruchmüller died at Garmisch-Partenkirchen in 1948.

Citations

Cited works

Further reading 
 
  Blythe, Wilson C. "Enduring Lessons From the Father of Modern Fires Planning", Fires: A Joint Publication for U.S. Artillery Professionals (July-August 2013), accessible online at: http://sillwww.army.mil/firesbulletin/2013/Jul-Aug/July-August.pdf

External links 
 Bruchmüller's biography

1863 births
1948 deaths
German Army personnel of World War I
Military personnel from Berlin
People from the Province of Brandenburg
Prussian Army personnel
Recipients of the Pour le Mérite (military class)